The Early Cretaceous Phra Wihan Formation is the second lowest member of the Mesozoic Khorat Group which outcrops in Northeast Thailand.

Comprises fine- to coarse-grained sheet and channelled sandstone beds and rarer variegated siltstone and mudstone. Intermittent conglomerate beds.

Deposited in a fluvial environment dominated by high-energy, shallow braided rivers with subordinate lower energy meandering river systems and associated flood plains.

The Phra Wihan Formation is considered to be Berriasian-Valanginian in age based on palynological analysis.

Sauropod (fossil) tracks have been recorded from this formation.

See also 
 List of dinosaur-bearing rock formations
 List of stratigraphic units with sauropodomorph tracks
 Sauropod tracks

References

Bibliography 
  

Geologic formations of Thailand
Lower Cretaceous Series of Asia
Cretaceous Thailand
Berriasian Stage
Valanginian Stage
Sandstone formations
Ichnofossiliferous formations
Paleontology in Thailand